Farghamu (Firgāmū, Farghamunj, Fargha Mikh, Farghā Mīkh, Farghāmū, frghamw, فرغامو) is a village in Badakhshan Province in north-eastern Afghanistan. It lies on the left bank of a stream in a valley of the Upper Kokcha River. The ground is generally laid out in fields. It is located on the frontier of the Shia-Posh Kafirs. Around the turn of the 20th century, roughly 30 families lived here. At that time, there was no bridge or ford of the river there.

References

Populated places in Yamgan District